Yayladağı, formerly Ordu, is a town and district of Hatay Province in southern Turkey, on the border between Turkey and Syria,  south of the city of Antakya.

History

The district has a long history dating back to the Hittites. Islam was brought here by the Abbasid Arabs, and from 1075 onwards the Seljuk Turks. During the Crusades, the mountains were part of the principality of Antioch, then they returned to Muslim control, and in 1518 were brought into the Ottoman Empire by Sultan Selim I during his campaign into Egypt.

Demographics
19th-century German traveler Martin Hartmann noted that the town was made up of 150 Muslim and 30 Greek households. He further listed 29 additional settlements in the Ottoman nahiyah of Urdu: 18 settlements  were Sunni Muslim (totaling to 495 houses), 14 of which were Turkish (400 houses). 1 settlement was Alawite (20 houses). 2 settlements were Armenian, one being Kessab (200 houses) and the other a village (15 houses). Hartmann didn't include any information on the remaining 7 settlements.

After the Syrian Civil War broke out, nearly 2,000 Syrian Turkmen moved here from Turkmen Mountain.

Geography

Today, Yayladağı itself is a small town of 5,717 people as of 2000 census, providing the district with a health centre, high schools and other basics. 

This is a mountainous district with a typical Mediterranean climate of hot, dry summers and warm, wet winters, but being inland and high up, Yayladağı is cooler than most of Hatay, even seeing snow on the mountain peaks in winter. The main source of income is agriculture,  of the land (small valleys and plateau in the mountains) is cultivated with olives, tobacco, vegetables, grains and other crops, the remainder is forest and mountain. The mountainsides are covered with pine, sandalwood and rough oak, or else shrubs including bay, thyme and oleander. Animals, especially goats, are grazed on the hillsides. 

Yayladağı has a border crossing into Syria, and the village of Topraktutan, Turkey's southernmost point. The state road  (European route ) connects the border checkpoint with Antakya.

References

External links
District governorate's official website 

Syria–Turkey border crossings
Populated places in Hatay Province
Districts of Hatay Province
Towns in Turkey